Kristian Karlsson (born 6 August 1991) is a Swedish table tennis player.

Career
Born in Trollhättan, Västra Götaland, Karlsson started to play table tennis in his hometown club at the age of 8. He remained in Trollhättan until he was 16, subsequently he moved away from home to go to high school. During his high school years Karlsson had 10 training sessions a week.

In 2011 he signed to Halmstad BTK and began to rose through the ranks quickly. Ranked outside the top 400 in October 2010, Karlsson finished 2011 in the 233th position, and at the end of 2012 he ranked 129. The year 2012 also marked his first senior success, winning the silver medal at the 2012 Table Tennis European Championships in men's doubles.

His performances also attracted French top division side AS Pontoise-Cergy TT and Karlsson eventually signed to the club in September 2013. He won the Champions League with AS Pontoise-Cergy in 2014.

In 2016 Kristian signed for the German top club Borussia Düsseldorf. After coming second in the Champions League and winning the German Cup, Kristian and Borussia Düsseldorf went on to win the triple in 2018.

Paired with Mattias Karlsson, Kristian won a bronze medal in men's doubles at the 2016 European Table Tennis Championships.

And in the 2018 European Table Tennis Championships, again paired with Mattias Karlsson, Kristian won a silver medal in the men's doubles as well as a bronze medal in the men's singles. During 2018 Kristian and the Swedish National Team won a Bronze medal (Team) in the 2018 World Team Table Tennis Championships in Halmstad, and also a gold medal in the Swedish Championship in Helsingborg.

2021
In March, Karlsson played in WTT Doha. In the first WTT Contender event, he made it to the round of 16, where he lost to Mattias Falck. In the second, WTT Star Contender event, Karlsson upset Liam Pitchford in a deuce-in-the-fifth thriller in the round of 32.

Karlsson & Mattias Falck won the world championship in men's doubles at the 2021 World Table Tennis Championships becoming the first Swedish duo to win gold since 1991.

2022
On 19 July 2022 he agreed on terms with Greek club Panathinaikos.

References

External links

1991 births
Living people
People from Trollhättan
Swedish male table tennis players
Swedish expatriate sportspeople in France
Table tennis players at the 2015 European Games
Table tennis players at the 2016 Summer Olympics
Olympic table tennis players of Sweden
European Games medalists in table tennis
Table tennis players at the 2019 European Games
European Games silver medalists for Sweden
Table tennis players at the 2020 Summer Olympics
World Table Tennis Championships medalists
Sportspeople from Västra Götaland County
Panathinaikos table tennis players
20th-century Swedish people
21st-century Swedish people